Moama ( or ) is a town in the Riverina district of southern New South Wales, Australia, in the Murray River Council local government area. The town is directly across the Murray River from the larger town of Echuca in the neighbouring state of Victoria, to which it is connected by a bridge. At the 2016 census, Moama had a population of 5,620.

History

Maiden's Punt
The settlement where Moama now stands was founded by James Maiden in the mid-1840s, beginning as a stopping-point for stock and cargo waiting to cross the Murray River by punt. He recognised a business opportunity and travelled to Seymour where he built a punt, which he then transported back to the Murray. The locality where the punt was placed on the river became known as Maiden's Punt. Maiden built a wooden public house, the Junction Inn, for which he obtained a licence in 1847.

During this early period Maiden's punt operated in opposition to another punt, owned by Isaac White, which was worked from the southern bank at Campaspe Junction (now Echuca).  However, it was Maiden's punt that captured most of the business.

Moama

A demand for land at Maiden's Punt prompted the New South Wales government to lay out a township there, named "Moama".  The name is derived from a local indigenous word meaning "burial ground".  The Moama township was gazetted on 16 December 1851. The post office opened on 1 January 1855 and was known as Maiden's Punt until 1857.

At a land sale in August 1855 James Maiden purchased 10 of the 30 lots sold.  Maiden sold the Junction Inn to Jeremiah Rolfe in 1855, but the next year he repurchased it.  When applying for a licence he told the Bench of Magistrates that he "intended to conduct it in a very superior manner with reduction of charges."  Maiden also intended expanding the hotel, utilising the brick house which was his former residence as accommodation "for the use of gentlemen and their families to and from Melbourne".

The growth of the paddlesteamer as a means for transporting cargo from the 1860s onwards saw both Moama and Echuca grow substantially.  Echuca's large wharf and its relatively short distance to Melbourne saw it overshadow its cross-border neighbour.

A traveller passing through Moama in mid-1865 described the township thus: "Here are erected a few straggling houses of wood or brick". By that stage Moama and Echuca were connected by a pontoon bridge, which, though too narrow for drays or coaches, was used for crossing sheep and horses.

Moama retains some impressive historical buildings (circa 1880s), namely the Moama Court House on Francis Street, the former New South Wales Police Force Sergeants official residence in Chanter Street, and the former Bank of New South Wales adjacent to the railway lines on Meninya Street.

Heritage listings 
Moama has a number of heritage-listed sites, including:
 Hunt Street: Moama Historic Precinct

Facilities

Moama currently has a permanent population of about 3700, although this swells significantly during holiday periods and the Southern 80 Water Ski race, held in February.

The town has its own New South Wales state primary school, Moama Public School, an Anglican secondary college, "Moama Anglican Grammar School".  It also has five full-time New South Wales Police Officers stationed at Moama Police Station adjacent to the Moama Court House on Francis Street; a New South Wales Rural Fire Service Station on Perricoota Road staffed by Volunteer Fire Fighters, a New South Wales Fire Brigade Station staffed by retained NSWFB personnel and a New South Wales State Emergency Service situated in the Moama Industrial area.  Ambulance services are provided by the Rural Ambulance Service of Victoria, stationed in Echuca.  The NSW Maritime and Roads and Traffic Authority are situated on Meninya Street, opposite the former Bank of New South Wales and adjacent to the Moama Sound Shell and the recently constructed War Memorial. NSW Maritime moved to a modern premises on the Cobb Highway in Moama's Industrial Estate in 2010.

The town has recently undergone a massive resurgence in people moving from Melbourne seeking a "tree change".  The Murray Shire Council has approved new developments in retail, sporting and residential sub divisions.  Located just outside Moama is the "Heartland" Speedway.

Murray River border 

The State of New South Wales takes in the Murray River up to the top of the riverbank on the Victorian side. The NSW Waterways Authority is a self-funding regulatory authority to ensure the safe and environmentally responsible use of NSW waterways including the Murray by all boat operators. New South Wales Police Force members attached to the Moama Police Station also patrol the Murray River in NSW Police Launch "Moama".

Tourism 

During the 1980s Moama received thousands of visitors each week from Melbourne, due to New South Wales' more liberal gambling laws and the presence of poker machines in some of Moama's entertainment venues. The legalisation of poker machines in Victoria killed off these day tours, although poker machines are still a significant tourist drawing card in the town.

Moama is also home to the Rich River Golf Club, an international-standard 36-hole golf course, and the Moama Bowling Club (lawn bowls). Both venues have hosted significant national tournaments and competitions. The town also possesses a moderately large number of hotels, caravan parks, resorts, rented houseboats and wineries.

A significant fire occurred at the Moama Bowling Club in June 2008, with an estimated damage bill of $3 million AUS.

Notable people of Moama
 Isaiah Firebrace (winner of the eighth season of The X Factor Australia & 2017 Eurovision entrant) grew up in Moama.
 Danny Lolicato (Young Engineer NSW 2017) was born in Moama in 1991.
 James Rogers, who served in South Africa during the Boer War and was awarded the Victoria Cross, was born in Moama in 1875.
 Mary Jeanette Robison known professionally as May Robson, the American-based actress whose career spanned 59 years from 1883 to 1942, was born in Moama in 1858.
 Lachie Schultz, Australian rules footballer

See also
 Moama Football Club

References

External links 

Echuca-Moama tourism information
Moama Railway Station

 
Towns in the Riverina
Towns in New South Wales
Echuca-Moama
Murray River Council